Phrynobatrachus dendrobates is a species of frogs in the family Phrynobatrachidae.

It is found in Democratic Republic of the Congo, Uganda, and possibly Tanzania.
Its natural habitats are subtropical or tropical moist montane forest and rivers.
It is threatened by habitat loss.

References

dendrobates
Amphibians described in 1919
Taxonomy articles created by Polbot